Sachem High School East is a public secondary school located in Farmingville, New York. Along with Sachem High School North, it is one of the two high schools in the Sachem School District.

History 
The school was founded in 2004, and was filled with students from the former Sachem High School South, which closed and was absorbed into Samoset Middle School.

Athletics 
Sachem East fields a number of varsity and junior varsity teams in the Section 11 Athletic Conference. Teams at Sachem East:

Boys Bowling
Girls Bowling
Boys Cross Country
Girls Cross Country
Boys Volleyball
Girls Volleyball
Boys Soccer
Girls Soccer
Field Hockey 
Boys Lacrosse
Girls Lacrosse
Football 
Girls Tennis
Boys Tennis
Girls Swimming
Boys Swimming
Boys Basketball
Girls Basketball
Wrestling
Boys Golf
Boys Track
Girls Track
Baseball
Softball
Cheerleading
Arrowettes (dance)
Fortnite E-Sports

A number of teams have won national, state, or regional championships. These include:

Varsity Field Hockey-Long Island Champions 2014, 2018
Varsity Cheerleading-National Title 2016
Girls Varsity Basketball-NYS Champion 2010

Academics 
Sachem East offers many of the Advanced Placement programs offered by the College Board, as well as many honors courses. It offers Spanish, French and Italian as foreign languages that can be taken. The school also offers classes in culinary arts, engineering, 3D printing, and cosmetology (which upon completion grants the student a cosmetology license). Sachem East has partnered with Eastern Suffolk BOCES to allow students to take courses through BOCES.

Extra Curriculars 
Sachem East offers many clubs for students to join. It also has chapters for many national honor societies including Math, Science, English, Social Studies, Business, Technology, Art, Music, and the National Honor Society. The school also fields several academic teams such as several History Bowl teams (the junior varsity 2017-18 team made it to the national competition in Washington, D.C.) and a DECA team.

Demographics

Notable alumni 
Keith Kinkaid - NHL goalie for the New York Rangers
Marc Sebastian fashion model, stylist, and activist
Ryan DeRobertis - Musician better known as Skylar Spence

References 

Public high schools in New York (state)
Schools in Suffolk County, New York
Educational institutions established in 2005
2005 establishments in New York (state)